Elphinstone Bridge is a bridge across the Adyar River in Chennai, India. Constructed in 1840 and named after the then Governor-General of India, the bridge is currently not in use and has been substituted with the newly built Thiru Vi. Ka. Bridge nearby.

References 

Former bridges in India
Bridges and flyovers in Chennai